Braidwood is a city in Will County, Illinois, United States, approximately  southwest of Chicago and  south of Joliet. The population was 6,191 at the 2010 census.

The Braidwood Nuclear Generating Station, a nuclear power plant currently owned by Exelon Corporation, is also located in the area (although the plant's address is actually in the nearby town of Braceville).  The station is one of the major employers in the area and provides a significant portion of the electricity used in the Chicago area. The plant has been the subject of controversy concerning a series of leaks since 2007

Reed-Custer Community Unit School District 255 educates students from in and around Braidwood, Custer Park, Essex, and Godley.  The district has 3 schools: Reed-Custer Elementary School (Grades PreK-5), Reed-Custer Middle School (Grades 6-8), and Reed-Custer High School (Grades 9-12).  The district level administrators are:  Mark Mitchell (Superintendent), Christine Nelson (Assistant Superintendent), and Jim King (Director of Operations). Reed-Custer High School is located at 249 Comet Drive in Braidwood, IL 60408, and is part of the Reed-Custer School District known as 255U.

Geography
Braidwood is located at  (41.271982, -88.218221).

Demographics

As of the census of 2000, there were 5,203 people, 1,843 households, and 1,422 families residing in the city. The racial makeup of the city was 97.48% White, 0.27% African American, 0.10% Native American, 0.33% Asian, 0.79% from other races, and 1.04% from two or more races. Hispanic or Latino of any race were 2.83% of the population. Was also known by Blacks to be a "sundown town".

There were 1,843 households, out of which 39.8% had children under the age of 18 living with them, 62.3% were married couples living together, 9.5% had a female householder with no husband present, and 22.8% were non-families. 18.5% of all households were made up of individuals, and 6.2% had someone living alone who was 65 years of age or older. The average household size was 2.81 and the average family size was 3.20.

In the city, the population was spread out, with 29.5% under the age of 18, 8.6% from 18 to 24, 32.2% from 25 to 44, 20.9% from 45 to 64, and 8.8% who were 65 years of age or older. The median age was 34 years. For every 100 females, there were 101.3 males. For every 100 females age 18 and over, there were 98.4 males.

Early history
In 1864, a farmer digging for water at the site of the present city found coal instead. Deposits were substantial and the demand for coal in nearby Chicago was high, so companies rushed to acquire land and set up operations. A mining boomtown sprang up, a post office was established in 1867, and the community was called Keeversville. James Braidwood was an early member of the community, and in 1872 he was hired by one company to superintend the sinking of the first deep mine shaft. The addition of more deep-shaft mines followed, and on March 4, 1873 the city was incorporated
and named in Braidwood's honor.

Concerning the city's early population, Donna reports, 

Businesses and the lives of residents were centered on the coal mines, with economic prosperity and depression occurring in their turn. Mines cut back operations during summer months, when warm weather reduced the demand for coal, leaving many miners unemployed. The disputes between coal companies and miners over wages and working conditions were always rancorous and often violent, typical for the late nineteenth and early twentieth centuries.

On February 16, 1883, the Diamond Mine in Braidwood was suddenly flooded, resulting in the deaths of 73 miners. See 1883 Diamond Mine Disaster.

There was a combination of ethnicities, providing religious and cultural diversity. At first most miners were Americans or immigrants from northern Europe. African Americans arrived from West Virginia, and many later residents would arrive as immigrants from eastern and southern Europe.

Notable people 

 Kay Cannon, writer (30 Rock); Emmy nominee
 Anton Cermak, immigrant from Bohemia and the 34th mayor of Chicago; worked as a miner in Braidwood.
 Brian Dubois, pitcher with the Detroit Tigers; played in the state championships with Reed-Custer High School
 Joseph Kain, Illinois businessman and politician
 Artie Matthews, a songwriter, pianist, and ragtime composer; born in Braidwood (1888)
 John Mitchell, early UMW president; born in Braidwood (1870, before incorporation); worked in the local mines as a child
 Les Norman, outfielder with the Kansas City Royals; played in the state championships with Reed-Custer High School
 Doug Pinnick, songwriter, bassist, and co-lead singer for rock band King's X; born and raised in Braidwood

Cultural references
 Braidwood Inn (now the Sun Motel) was featured in the film Planes, Trains and Automobiles.

Notes

External links

 City of Braidwood website
 School website

Cities in Illinois
Cities in Will County, Illinois
Populated places established in 1867
1867 establishments in Illinois